Subject 13 may refer to:

 Subject 13 (Fringe), an episode of Fringe
 Subject 13 (video game), a point-and-click adventure game